Trailer is a mini album by the band Ash featuring their first three singles. An expanded edition also includes four B-sides. The album was released in October 1994 through Infectious Records. The band considered it a "trailer" for their future debut album proper, and named it accordingly.

"Uncle Pat" was featured in a Heineken advert, which helped to raise the profile of the band, both in Ireland and Britain.

The name refers to movie trailers, so as a visual pun, the cover of the album shows a toppled truck trailer.

The 'noise' at the end of the track "Get Out", when reversed, slowed down and the pitch altered, is a low quality demo version of the song "Intense Thing".  This track wasn't discovered until June 2006 by 2 fans experimenting around with running different effects through Ash songs.

An early rare version of this album was released with a bonus John Peel Sessions 7" with the tracks:
 "Silver Surfer" - 2:24
 "Jazz '59" - 2:06
On 6 June 1995, Trailer was released in the United States. "Jack Names the Planets" was released as a single there on August 15, 1995.

Track listing
"Season" (Wheeler) – 3:00
"Jack Names the Planets" - (February 1994) (Wheeler) – 3:10
"Intense Thing" (Hamilton, McMurray, Wheeler) – 4:34
"Uncle Pat" – (17 October 1994) (Wheeler) – 3:12
"Get Out" (Hamilton, Wheeler) – 1:29
"Petrol" - (5 August 1994) (Hamilton, Wheeler) – 4:24
"Obscure Thing" (Hamilton, McMurray, Wheeler) – 4:18

US and Japan bonus tracks

Tracks 8–11 only appear on the US and Japan versions of the album. "Different Today" and "Hulk Hogan Bubblebath" appeared on the B-side of "Uncle Pat". "Day of the Triffids" originally appeared as a B-side of "Kung Fu" – (20 March 1995).

Singles 

"Jack Names the Planets" was released in February, 1994 with "Don't Know".
"Petrol" was released 15 August 1994 with "The Little Pond" and "Things".
"Uncle Pat" was released 17 October 1994 with "Different Today" and "Hulk Hogan Bubblebath".

Personnel 

Ash - producer, sleeve art
Rob Cavallo - mixing
Mark Hamilton - bass
Louise McCormick - engineer
Rick "Rock" McMurray - drums
Tim Russell - producer, mixing
Smike - photography
Marc Waterman - producer
Tim Wheeler - guitar, vocals
Oscar Wilde - dialogue

References

Ash (band) albums
Infectious Records albums
1994 debut albums
Punk rock albums by artists from Northern Ireland